The CSV qualification for the 2014 FIVB Volleyball Women's World Championship saw member nations compete for two places at the finals in Italy. The champion team at the 2013 Women's South American Volleyball Championship, plus the best team from the qualification tournament qualified for the World Championship.

Participating nations
7 CSV national teams entered CSV championship as qualification tournament. Uruguay later withdrew.

South American Championship

 The next four teams advanced to the final qualification tournament but Venezuela withdrew.

Qualification tournament
Venue:  Polideportivo Aldo Cantoni, San Juan, Argentina
Dates: October 18–20, 2013
All times are Argentina Time (UTC−03:00)

|}

|}

 Argentina won the first two set (25–20, 25–19) but Peru withdrew in the middle of the third set (13–9) and officially lost by triple 0–25.

References

2014 FIVB Volleyball Women's World Championship
FIVB Women's Volleyball World Championship qualification
Volleyball World Championship qualification
FIVB Volleyball World Championship qualification